Earlville may refer to places in:

Australia 
 Earlville, Queensland, a suburb in Cairns

United States 
 Earlville, Illinois
 Earlville, Iowa
 Earlville, New York